Lagerlöf is a Swedish surname. Notable people with the surname include:

Daniel Lind Lagerlöf (1969 – presumed 2011), Swedish film director
Leon Lagerlöf (1870–1951), Swedish sport shooter
Selma Lagerlöf (1858–1940), Swedish writer
Thomas Lagerlöf (born 1971), Swedish association football coach

See also
11061 Lagerlöf, a main-belt asteroid

Swedish-language surnames